WRHS may refer to:

High schools
 Wachusett Regional High School, in Holden, Massachusetts
 Wahconah Regional High School, in Dalton, Massachusetts
 Warner Robins High School, in Warner Robins, Georgia
 Washburn Rural High School, in Topeka, Kansas, United States
 West Ranch High School, in Stevenson Ranch, California
 West Roxbury High School in Boston, Massachusetts
 Woodland Regional High School, in Beacon Falls, Connecticut
 Wheat Ridge High School, in Wheat Ridge, Colorado
 Whalley Range High School, in Manchester, England
 Wiregrass Ranch High School, in Wesley Chapel, Florida

Other
 WRHS (FM), a radio station in Grasonville, Maryland, United States
 Western Reserve Historical Society, in Cleveland, Ohio